The Definitive Collection is the first greatest hits album by Australian singer song writer Archie Roach. The album features tracks from Roach's first four studio albums and was released in July 2004.

Track listing

Release history

References

2004 greatest hits albums
Archie Roach albums
Mushroom Records compilation albums
Compilation albums by Australian artists